Paraíso is a corregimiento in Boquerón District, Chiriquí Province, Panama. Its population as of 1990 was 190; its population as of 2000 was 248.

References

Corregimientos of Chiriquí Province